Perry Carlton Lentz (born March 27, 1943, in Anniston, Alabama) is a teacher, an author, and professor of English language and literature at Kenyon College in Gambier, Ohio.

Early life and education
The son of Lucian Boyd Lentz, a sales executive, and his wife, Adelaide Carleton Sterne, Perry Lentz attended Kenyon College, and was a member of Delta Kappa Epsilon, graduating with his Bachelor of Arts in English in 1964, summa cum laude with Highest Honors in English. He went on to Vanderbilt University, where he earned his master's degree in 1966 and his PhD in 1970. He married Jane Anderson in 1965; they have two children, Robin Lentz and Emily Hollis, and six grandchildren, Amos, Etta, and Piper DeMartino, and Abraham, Margaret, and Arlo Hollis.

Academic career
As a graduate student, Lentz served as a teaching fellow at Vanderbilt University between 1964 and 1969. In 1969, he returned to Kenyon College, where he has spent his entire career, being appointed assistant professor of English in 1969, associate professor in 1973, and then full professor. He was subsequently appointed to an academic chair, McIlvaine Professor of English, and has served as chairman of the English Department.

He was a Woodrow Wilson Fellow in 1964 and held a Rockefeller Foundation grant in 1971. In 1978–79, he was visiting professor at Exeter University in England.

In honor of his distinguished tenure and teaching excellence, Kenyon College opened the Lentz House for its Department of English in 2009.  Lending his name to the new English building places Lentz in the ranks of other highly distinguished Kenyon faculty, such as John Crowe Ransom, for whom Ransom Hall, Kenyon's Admissions building, was renamed in 1958.

Published works
 The Falling Hills, New York, Scribner, [1967]; Columbia : University of South Carolina Press, 1993.
 It Must Be Now the Kingdom Coming: An Historical Romance, New York, Crown [1973].
 Private Fleming at Chancellorsville: The Red Badge of Courage and the Civil War, Columbia: University of Missouri Press, 2006.
 Perish From the Earth [2008]

Sources

 Who's Who
 Contemporary Authors

References

1943 births
People from Anniston, Alabama
Living people
Kenyon College alumni
Kenyon College faculty
American historical novelists
American literary critics
Vanderbilt University alumni
American male novelists
Novelists from Ohio
American male non-fiction writers